KB AS Kastrioti is a professional basketball club based in Kastriot, Kosovo. The club currently plays in the Kosovo Basketball First League. Its fan club is called Elektricistët, or Electricians.

History
The club was founded in 2012 by some young basketball fans from nearby Prishtina.

Arena
The club currently plays in the sport center "Adem Jashari", in the center of Kastriot, with a capacity for around 1000 spectators.

References

External links
 Eurobasket.com
  Official Facebook page

Basketball teams in Kosovo